Darryl Wintle (born 7 April 1976) is an Australian rules footballer who played with Adelaide in the Australian Football League (AFL).

Wintle trained at the Kangaroos but it was reigning premiers Adelaide who picked him up in the 1999 Pre-Season draft, with the third last selection. He made three appearances, early in the 1999 AFL season, but was delisted at the end of the year.

He returned to North Adelaide and in 2002 was appointed club captain. The club finished with the wooden spoon in his second year as captain but he would lead North Adelaide to a grand final in 2007, which they lost to Central District. Wintle is just the third North Adelaide player to captain 100 games, after Ian McKay and Don Lindner. He retired at the end of the 2008 season, after playing 186 SANFL games, but has continued playing in the South Australian Amateur Football League with Broadview, who he also coaches.

References

External links
 
 

1976 births
Australian rules footballers from South Australia
Adelaide Football Club players
North Adelaide Football Club players
Living people